Guararé District is a district (distrito) of Los Santos Province in Panama. The population according to the 2000 census was 9,485. The district covers a total area of 216 km². The capital lies at the city of Guararé.

Administrative divisions
Guararé District is divided administratively into the following corregimientos:

Guararé (capital)
El Espinal
El Macano
Guararé Arriba
La Enea
La Pasera
Las Trancas
Llano Abajo
El Hato
Perales

References

Districts of Panama
Los Santos Province